Dragana Branković Minčić is a politician in Serbia. She was elected to the National Assembly of Serbia in the 2020 parliamentary election as a member of the Serbian Progressive Party.

Private career
Branković Minčić lives in Zaječar. She has a Bachelor of Science degree and is the director of the pharmacy Zaječar.

Politician
Branković Minčić received the seventy-fifth position on the Progressive Party's Aleksandar Vučić — For Our Children coalition list in the 2020 Serbian parliamentary election and was elected when the list won a landslide majority with 188 out of 250 mandates. She is now a member of the health and family committee and the committee on human and minority rights and gender equality, a deputy member of the committee on the rights of the child, the leader of Serbia's parliamentary friendship group with Equatorial Guinea, and a member of the parliamentary friendship groups with Cape Verde, Chile, China, Cuba, Cyprus, the Czech Republic, Greece, Japan, Morocco, Portugal, Russia, Spain, and Turkey.

References

1970 births
Living people
People from Zaječar
Members of the National Assembly (Serbia)
Serbian Progressive Party politicians